Bangor Rugby Football Club (Welsh: Clwb Rygbi Bangor) is a Welsh rugby union team based in Bangor, North Wales. Bangor RFC is a founding member of the Welsh Rugby Union. The club fields a Seniors, Youth, Juniors and Ladies teams.

History
Bangor RFC was formed in 1876, with three players in the team who would eventually represent their country, Hugh Vincent, Charles Allen and Godfrey Darbishire. In 1881 Bangor RFC sent representatives to the Castle Hotel in Neath where they were one of the clubs that formed the Welsh Rugby Union. That same year Bangor RFC player Godfrey Darbishire played in the first Welsh international against England.

All competitive rugby ceased in Wales after the outbreak of World War I, and Bangor RFC disbanded. Although rugby was played after the War it wasn't until 1929 that Bangor RFC reformed and played in the North Wales Rugby Union league. Bangor RFC were based in Beaumaris on the Isle of Anglesey until 1962, when they moved to The Wern on Caernarfon Road, Bangor. The Club relocated again in 1995 to its current base in Llandygai. The Club has helped develop 8 Welsh internationals and 3 British Lions. Former player Tony Gray was coach of the Triple Crown winning Welsh National side in 1988.

Present day
The 1st XV is currently playing in SWALEC Division 2 North.

Players of note
  Charles Peter Allen (2 caps)
  Godfrey Darbishire (1 cap)
  Sir Hugh Corbet Vincent (1 cap)
  Robin McBryde (37 caps) (British & Irish Lion)
  Stuart Roy (1 cap)
  Tony Gray (2 caps) (former Wales coach)
  Roland De Marigny (19 caps)
  Geoff Evans (7 caps) (British & Irish Lion)
  Dewi Bebb (34 caps) (British & Irish Lion) 
  Guy Manson-Bishop (Barbarians, London Scottish, Sale & Leicester)
  Gavin Whittingham (Glasgow Warriors & Natal U21s)
  Morne Snyman (Griquas & Natal U21s)
  Shane Fletcher (Horowhenua) (Current North Canterbury Coach)

Rugby League
  Phil Vievers (1 cap) (Current Salford City Reds Coach)
  Chris Byrne (GB Students)
  Ben Barton (Huddersfield Giants)

Notes

Rugby clubs established in 1876
Welsh rugby union teams
Sport in Gwynedd
Sport in Bangor, Gwynedd
1876 establishments in Wales